The freckle-breasted woodpecker (Dendrocopos analis) is a species of bird in the family Picidae.
It is found in Indonesia, Laos, Myanmar, Thailand, Cambodia, and Vietnam.

Description
A medium-sized, pied woodpecker. Upperparts black, heavily barred white. Undertail red, breast und belly buffwith light flank barring and slight side streaking. Withish cheeks partly bordered by black line. Crown red in male with orange forehead, black in female.

Habitat
Its natural habitats are subtropical or tropical dry forest, subtropical or tropical moist lowland forest, and subtropical or tropical moist montane forest.

References

freckle-breasted woodpecker
Birds of Southeast Asia
freckle-breasted woodpecker
freckle-breasted woodpecker